The following is a list of players, both past and current, who were under contract with the Connecticut Sun (and Orlando Miracle) in the WNBA during the regular season (not including pre-season).

References